Sir Cecil Clementi Smith  (23 December 1840 – 6 February 1916), was a British colonial administrator.

Background
The son of an Essex rector, John Smith, and his wife Cecilia Susanna Clementi (daughter of Muzio Clementi), Cecil Clementi Smith received his education at St Paul's School and Corpus Christi College, Cambridge. In 1864 he began his civil service career as a cadet interpreter in Hong Kong, learning much about the Chinese culture and gradually became an accomplished scholar of the Chinese culture. He was also the Colonial Treasurer of Hong Kong.

Civil Service

On 3 September 1878, Clementi Smith took office in Singapore as a Colonial Secretary in the Straits Settlements, and understudied Governor Frederick Weld. His knowledge of Chinese culture and competence in the language proved useful as he was able to communicate effectively with leaders of the growing Chinese community.

Smith became known for his effective work in quelling Chinese secret societies in the Straits Settlements, such as those in Singapore which had been terrorising locals for decades. He also established the Queen's Scholarships in 1889 to fund bright Singaporean students to further their studies in top British universities.

In 1887 he was appointed Governor of the Straits Settlements and High Commissioner to Malaya till 1893. A popular governor, the local Chinese community petitioned for a continuation of his appointment when he left Singapore in 1893.

Subsequently, he was Lieutenant Governor of Ceylon, and the Master of the Mercers' Company in 1897. He was president of the commission of inquiry on the Trinidad riots in 1903, and was chief British delegate to International Opium Convention at The Hague in 1912.

Family
Clementi Smith married Teresa Alice Newcomen in 1869, they had three children, Hubert (born …), Beatrice (born ) and Eustace (born c. 1879, and later a lieutenant colonel). Clementi Smith died in Welwyn, Hertfordshire, England, on 6 February 1916, aged 75. His nephew was Sir Cecil Clementi who also served as Governor of the Straits Settlements and in other administrative positions in Hong Kong and Singapore.

Honours and awards
Clementi Smith was invested with Companion of the Order of St Michael and St George (CMG) in 1880, Knight Commander of the Order of St Michael and St George (KCMG) in 1886 and Knight Grand Cross of the Order of St Michael and St George (GCMG) in 1892.

He was also being appointed as Privy Counsellor in 1906.

References

External links
.
.
.

1840 births
1916 deaths
Alumni of Corpus Christi College, Cambridge
Colonial Administrative Service officers
Financial Secretaries of Hong Kong
Governors of Penang
Governors of the Straits Settlements
Knights Grand Cross of the Order of St Michael and St George
People educated at St Paul's School, London
British people of Italian descent
Chief Secretaries of Ceylon
Members of the Privy Council of the United Kingdom
Chief Secretaries of Singapore
Administrators in British Singapore